Rudhauli is a constituency of the Uttar Pradesh Legislative Assembly covering the city of Rudhauli in the Basti district of Uttar Pradesh, India.

Rudhauli is one of five assembly constituencies in the Basti Lok Sabha constituency. Since 2008, this assembly constituency is numbered 309 amongst 403 constituencies.

Geographical scope
The constituency comprises parts of below areas:
2-Rudhauli Tehsil; KCs 1-Ramnagar, 2-Sagara, 4-Dasia, PCs 51- Amma, 52-Mahnowa, 53-Banarjijangal, 54-Padaree, 55- Hasanpur, 56-Dumaree, 57-Ourjangal, 58-Amrouli Sumali, 59-
Pitout, 60-Pachanoo, 61-Delpar Khurd, 62-Basthanwa, 63-Majhouwa Khurd, 66-Jagatpur, 69-Pakaree Bhikhi, 70-Chamraha and 71-Sakroula of KC 3-Sonaha of 4-Bhanpur Tehsil.

Members of the Legislative Assembly

Election results

2022
Samajwadi Party candidate Rajendra Prasad Chaudhary won in last Assembly election of 2022 Uttar Pradesh Legislative Elections defeating Bhartiya Janata Party candidate Sangeeta Pratap Jaiswal by a margin of 15,226 votes.

 

^ Proutist Bloc India (Political party)

See also
 Rudhauli
 Seventeenth Legislative Assembly of Uttar Pradesh
 Basti Lok Sabha constituency
 Basti district
 List of constituencies of Uttar Pradesh Legislative Assembly
 Mugraha Village

References

External links
 

Assembly constituencies of Uttar Pradesh
Basti district